Giuseppe Bianchi was an Italian architect who worked in the church of Saint John the Evangelist in Parma in 1749.  This choir stalls were carved by Andrea Boschi.

Architects from Parma
18th-century Italian architects
18th-century Italian people
Year of birth unknown
Year of death unknown